The Eagle River Cemetery, also called the Evergreen Cemetery, is a cemetery located on highway M-26 about  south of Eagle River, Michigan. It was listed as a Michigan State Historic Site on July 17, 1986, and is one of the oldest cemeteries in the Keweenaw Peninsula.

The cemetery holds 317 graves that date from 1843 through the present; 98 from the nineteenth century. However, the owner of the cemetery property, the Cliff Mining Company, did not officially set it aside until 1876.

See also
 List of Michigan State Historic Sites in Keweenaw County, Michigan

References

External links
 

Cemeteries in Michigan
Michigan State Historic Sites in Keweenaw County
1843 establishments in Michigan